Badshah Moitra (also known as Badshah Maitra) is an Indian actor, who primarily works in Bengali TV soap operas and films.

Career
Badshah started his career in Bengali theatre and stage. He made his debut in television though Janmabhumi telecasted on DD Bangla. Thereafter, he has performed in numerous roles both as supporting and lead actor in TV soap operas and movies. He is also a supporter of Communist Party of India (Marxist). Beside these, he is very active in social welfare work for the people.

List of works

Filmography
Gotro (2019)
Mukherjee Dar Bou (2019)
Bristi Tomake Dilam (2019)
Bhobishyoter Bhoot (2019)
Nirbhoya (2018)
Kintu Galpo Noy (2018)
Aaleya (2018)
Khirki Theke Singhadwar (2017)
Black Coffee (Bengali) (2017)
Raater Rajani Gandha (2016)
Room No. 103 (2015)
Troyee (2015)
Mayabazaar (Bengali) (2012)
Byatikrami (2003)
Ekjon Jhumur (2002)

Television

Web series
Sudakshinar Saree (2020) by ZEE5 Originals

References

External links
 

Year of birth missing (living people)
Living people
Bengali male television actors
Bengali actors
Male actors in Bengali cinema
21st-century Indian actors